Vassar Glacier is a  long glacier in the U.S. state of Alaska. It was named for Vassar College in Poughkeepsie, New York, by members of the 1899 Harriman Alaska Expedition.

See also
 List of glaciers

References

Glaciers of Alaska
Glaciers of Chugach Census Area, Alaska
Glaciers of Unorganized Borough, Alaska
Vassar College